The Shrine of Our Lady of Sorrows is a historic Roman Catholic church located at Starkenburg, Montgomery County, Missouri.  It is dedicated to Our Lady of Sorrows. In addition to Stations of the Cross and two grottos, the shrine includes the Church of the Risen Savior (1873), Chapel of Our Lady of Sorrows (1910), and Log Chapel (1888). The Chapel of Our Lady of Sorrows replaced an earlier 19th century log church, which was retained on the site as a chapel.  The shrine was built by a congregation of mid-19th century German immigrants and their descendants.  The Church of the Risen Savior is a Gothic Revival style limestone block structure.  The bell tower was added in 1891.

The Chapel of Our Lady of Sorrows was designed by Professor Becker of Mainz, Germany, with John Walchshauser, an architect from St. Louis.  The Romanesque Revival style structure was built between 1906 and 1910, with limestone quarried by parishioners and much labor provided by them.

It was listed on the National Register of Historic Places in 1982.

See also
 Our Lady of Sorrows

References

1873 establishments in Missouri
German-American culture in Missouri
Churches in the Roman Catholic Diocese of Jefferson City
Churches on the National Register of Historic Places in Missouri
Gothic Revival church buildings in Missouri
Roman Catholic churches completed in 1873
19th-century Roman Catholic church buildings in the United States
Roman Catholic churches completed in 1910
20th-century Roman Catholic church buildings in the United States
Churches in Montgomery County, Missouri
Tourist attractions in Montgomery County, Missouri
National Register of Historic Places in Montgomery County, Missouri
Starkenburg, Missouri
Our Lady of Sorrows